is a Nippon Professional Baseball player. He is currently with the Hiroshima Toyo Carp.

In August 2010, Masato made sports headlines by denying batter Shuichi Murata a home run with what sportswriters dubbed the "Spider-Man Catch," rapidly scaling the outfield fence before snaring the ball in midleap. He won the Gold Glove that same year.

References

External links

Living people
1982 births
Hanshin Tigers players
Hiroshima Toyo Carp players
Japanese baseball players
Nippon Professional Baseball outfielders
Baseball people from Kyoto
Japanese baseball coaches
Nippon Professional Baseball coaches